B'nai Israel is a Modern Orthodox synagogue located in the historic Jonestown neighborhood, near downtown and the Inner Harbor of Baltimore. The synagogue is one of the oldest synagogue buildings still standing in the United States.

Architecture
The synagogue is noted for its Moorish Revival architecture.  The Aron Kodesh is an architectural fantasy in carved wood, with the cabinet in which the Torah scrolls are stored, surrounded by a pair of tall minarets.

Leadership
Rabbi Etan Mintz is the spiritual leader of B'nai Israel Synagogue.

History
A group of members of Baltimore Hebrew Congregation believed that the congregation had become too liberal and modernistic. In 1873 they formed a new congregation, Chizuk Amuno.

Members of a Russian speaking congregation made of immigrants from the pale of settlement broke off from a Polish speaking congregation. The "Ruschie Shul" would practice wherever they could: people's houses, the upper levels of grocery stores. In the years between 1880 and 1910, hundreds of thousands of Jews came from the Pale of Settlement, and the longstanding German Jews moved to North West Baltimore.

The building itself was built by Chizuk Amuno Congregation in 1876. Chizuk Amuno Congregation sold the building to B'nai Israel for $12,000 in 1895 when it moved to Northwest Baltimore.

In 1973, the congregation began raising funds for the restoration of the synagogue.

B'nai Israel donated land to the City of Baltimore to build a park near the synagogue in 1975. Named Freedom Park, the park honors victims of oppression.

References

External links

1873 establishments in Maryland
Jonestown, Baltimore
Modern Orthodox Judaism in Maryland
Modern Orthodox synagogues in the United States
Moorish Revival architecture in Maryland
Moorish Revival synagogues
Orthodox Judaism in Baltimore
Orthodox synagogues in Maryland
Lithuanian-American culture in Baltimore
Lithuanian-Jewish culture in Maryland
Polish-Jewish culture in Baltimore
Synagogues completed in 1845
Religious organizations established in 1873
Russian-Jewish culture in Baltimore
Synagogues in Baltimore
Synagogues preserved as museums
Ukrainian-Jewish culture in Baltimore
Baltimore City Landmarks